Peter Walden Milonni (born 5 May 1947) is an American theoretical physicist who deals with quantum optics, laser physics, quantum electrodynamics and the Casimir effect.

Milonni earned his PhD in 1974 at the University of Rochester. He then worked at the Air Force Weapons Laboratory from 1974 to 1977, then working at PerkinElmer from 1977 to 1980. In 1980 he became Professor of Physics at the University of Arkansas; From 1986 to 1994 he was at the Los Alamos National Laboratory, where he became a fellow of the laboratory from 1994 onwards. He then had a research professorship at the University of Rochester.

He is in on editorial boards of Progress in Optics, Contemporary Physics, Advances in Optics & Photonics and Physical Review Letters. Milonni is also author of several textbooks and monographs including The Quantum Vacuum: An Introduction to Quantum Electrodynamics.

In 2008 he received the Max Born Award "For exceptional contributions to the fields of theoretical optics, laser physics and quantum mechanics, and for dissemination of scientific knowledge through authorship of a series of outstanding books".

Selected publications

Popular Science

Academic papers

Books

See also

References

External links
Casimir Effects, Institute for Quantum Computing talk by Peter Milonni
Max Born Award
Peter W. Milonni, Department of Physics and Astronomy, University of Rochester

Living people
Theoretical physicists
Quantum physicists
20th-century American physicists
Niagara University alumni
People from Niagara County, New York
University of Rochester alumni
Air Force Research Laboratory people
University of Arkansas faculty
People from Fayetteville, Arkansas
Los Alamos National Laboratory personnel
University of Rochester faculty
Scientists from Rochester, New York
1947 births